In enzymology, a corticosterone 18-monooxygenase is an enzyme that catalyzes the chemical reaction

corticosterone + reduced adrenal ferredoxin + O2  18-hydroxycorticosterone + oxidized adrenal ferredoxin + H2O

The 3 substrates of this enzyme are corticosterone, reduced adrenal ferredoxin, and O2, whereas its 3 products are 18-hydroxycorticosterone, oxidized adrenal ferredoxin, and H2O.

This enzyme belongs to the family of oxidoreductases, specifically those acting on paired donors, with O2 as oxidant and incorporation or reduction of oxygen. The oxygen incorporated need not be derived from O2 with reduced iron-sulfur protein as one donor, and incorporation of one atom of oxygen into the other donor.  The systematic name of this enzyme class is corticosterone,reduced-adrenal-ferredoxin:oxygen oxidoreductase (18-hydroxylating). Other names in common use include corticosterone 18-hydroxylase, and corticosterone methyl oxidase.  This enzyme participates in c21-steroid hormone metabolism.

References 

EC 1.14.15
Enzymes of unknown structure